Chowdarguda is a mandal of Ranga Reddy district, Telangana, India.

References

Villages in Ranga Reddy district